Owen Daniels (born November 9, 1982) is an American meteorologist and former football player. He played as a tight end in the National Football League (NFL). He played college football for the University of Wisconsin, and was drafted by the Houston Texans in the fourth round of the 2006 NFL Draft. He is a two-time Pro Bowl selection. He also played for the Baltimore Ravens and Denver Broncos. As a member of the Broncos, he helped the team win Super Bowl 50 over the Carolina Panthers.

High school career
Daniels attended Naperville Central High School in Naperville, Illinois. As a starting quarterback on the football team, Daniels led Naperville Central to an undefeated IHSA Class 6A State Championship in 1999. He earned Prep Football Report and PrepStar All-American honors and was named a Top 100 prospect nationally by PFR. As a junior, he completed 100 of 168 passing attempts for 1,750 yards and 17 touchdowns, against just 1 interception.  He completed 30 of 35 passes for 562 yards and 7 touchdowns in the opening two games of his senior year before a knee injury ended his season. He was also the starting center on his basketball team and a 22-foot (6.70m) long jumper on the track & field team.

College career
Daniels attended the University of Wisconsin–Madison and played for the Wisconsin Badgers football team under coach Barry Alvarez.  At Wisconsin, he red-shirted his freshman year at the quarterback position.  Early in his college career, he was a back-up quarterback and played special teams, flanker, split end, and wingback.  He eventually assumed the starting job at tight end for most of his final two seasons with the Badgers. During his career at Wisconsin, Daniels played in 43 games with 62 receptions for 852 yards (13.7 average) earning him the moniker "Ole Sure Hands".  He graduated from the University of Wisconsin with a bachelor of science degree in atmospheric and oceanic sciences.

Professional career

Houston Texans

Daniels was drafted in the fourth round with the 98th overall pick in the 2006 NFL Draft. He earned the nickname "The Weatherman" as he majored in meteorology and appeared on the Madison area news delivering the local forecast.  As a Professional, the moniker, "O.D." seems to have stuck amongst Texans fans, Houston media, and users of NFL-related message boards.

In 2006, Daniels finished his rookie season with 34 receptions for 352 yards with five touchdowns.

Daniels completed the 2007 NFL season starting all 16 games with 63 receptions for 768 yards and three touchdowns.

On November 2, 2008, Daniels had his "best game of his career", according to the Houston Chronicle, against the Minnesota Vikings with 11 receptions for 133 yards. On December 7, 2008, he and quarterback Matt Schaub combined for a 27-yard completion during a game-winning drive to defeat the Green Bay Packers. He completed the 2008 season with 70 receptions for 862 yards with a trip to the 2009 Pro Bowl. He and teammate Andre Johnson were considered the most prolific tight end-wide receiver combination in the NFL with 185 catches for 2,437 yards.

On November 1, 2009 in a game against the Buffalo Bills, Daniels tore his ACL and was placed on season ending injured reserve.

On March 3, 2011 Daniels signed a 4 year $22 Million contract extension with the Houston Texans.

On March 11, 2014, Daniels was released by the team.

Baltimore Ravens
Daniels agreed on a one-year contract worth $1 million with the Baltimore Ravens and joined head coach John Harbaugh on April 3, 2014. Following a season-ending injury to starter Dennis Pitta, Daniels took over the starting role and amassed 48 receptions for 527 yards and four touchdowns.

Denver Broncos
On March 10, 2015, Daniels signed a three-year, $12 million contract with the Denver Broncos and joined head coach Gary Kubiak. Daniels played his entire NFL career under the tutelage of Kubiak (head coach in Houston and Denver, offensive coordinator in Baltimore) and tight ends coach Brian Pariani. Daniels started the season with only 85 receiving yards and was not a large factor until the game against the Green Bay Packers with three catches for 44 yards. Daniels then had 102 receiving yards and a touchdown in a 24-27 loss to Indianapolis Colts.
Daniels finished the 2015 season with 46 catches for 517 yards and three touchdowns. The Broncos had a 12-4 record and earned the #1 seed for the AFC playoffs. Denver defeated the Pittsburgh Steelers in the first playoff game by a score of 23-16. Daniels had 2 catches for 10 yards. In the AFC Championship game against the defending champion New England Patriots, Daniels scored two touchdowns to help the Broncos defeat the Patriots by a score of 20-18 to advance to Super Bowl 50 where they beat the Carolina Panthers 24-10. In the victory over the Patriots, Daniels caught the last touchdown pass that quarterback Peyton Manning ever threw in the NFL. In Super Bowl 50, Daniels had one catch for 18 yards on the Broncos' opening drive in the 24-10 victory. Daniels's catch helped the Broncos get in position to score a field goal for the first points of the game.

On March 8, 2016, the Broncos released Daniels after one season with the team.

After his time with the Broncos, Daniels did not sign with another NFL team.

NFL career statistics

Regular season

Playoffs

Personal life

Owen has been married to his wife, Angela, since 2013. The couple met at the Blondes vs. Brunettes charity football game. The couple had their first date in Ibiza and it is also where Owen proposed to her. Together they had their first child in 2015, Henry. He makes regular television appearances as an expert discussing the impacts of weather on American football.

References

External links

 Denver Broncos bio 
 Baltimore Ravens bio 
 Houston Texans bio 

1982 births
Living people
Sportspeople from Naperville, Illinois
Players of American football from Illinois
American football tight ends
Wisconsin Badgers football players
Houston Texans players
Baltimore Ravens players
Denver Broncos players
American meteorologists
American Conference Pro Bowl players